MTF may refer to:

 Magnetized target fusion
 Male-to-female, a transgender woman
 Microsoft Tape Format
 Ministerial Taskforce on Indigenous Affairs, Australia, since 2004
 Modulation transfer function, an optical transfer function
 Monitoring the Future, a study of drug use
 Mordenkainen's Tome of Foes, a supplement for the 5th edition of the roleplaying game Dungeons & Dragons
 Move-to-front transform, a data encoding
 Multilateral trading facility, an EU term
 Myocardial depressant factor

See also
 
 
 MFT (disambiguation)